Idioglossa polliacola is a tiny species of moth of the family Batrachedridae.

Taxonomy
It was described as a new species and placed in the family Batrachedridae by Kazuhiro Sugisima and Yutaka Arita in 2000. Arita had studied the unknown species on and off for a number of decades before it was identified as a type of Idioglossa. It is known from Japan, where it is quite abundant in the forests of Honshu.

Description
The wingspan is 8–9.7 mm. The fore-wings of this species are chrome-yellowish with four metallic greyish markings.

Ecology
The caterpillars use the Commelinaceae plant Pollia japonica, a common, herbaceous, understory, ground-covering plant in Japanese woodlands, as a host plant. They feed on the undersides of the leaves, each caterpillar individually constructing an elaborate web of silken sheets held off the lower surface of the leaf by tiny pillars of its own frass. The caterpillars furthermore always chew a small hole through the leaf as an extra escape hatch, rapidly flipping to a specially constructed silken pouch on the upper leaf surface when potential danger nears. The caterpillar remains inconspicuously hidden under this sheet throughout its development. The cocoons are constructed on the upper leaf surface near the midrib.

Related pages
List of moths of Japan

References

jpmoths.org: images of this species

Moths described in 2000
Batrachedridae